Women's baseball is played in several countries. The strongest and most organized women's baseball leagues are in the United States, Australia, Japan, Taiwan, Cuba, Hong Kong, and Canada. Those countries have national governing bodies that support girls' and women's baseball programs. Other countries/regions that currently have organized women's baseball are Germany, France, Netherlands, Croatia, India, South Korea, Venezuela, Argentina, Puerto Rico, Colombia, Brazil, Dominican Republic, and Pakistan. There also is a handful of women playing baseball in Vietnam currently on the Fishanu team at Hanoi University and on the Hanoi Baseball Club.

Internationally, the World Baseball Softball Confederation is the world governing body for women's and men's baseball, as well as women's and men's softball. The WBSC was created in 2013.

Timeline
Important events and milestones in women's baseball:

 1875 – The first women's baseball game for which fans were charged and women players were paid was played between the Blondes and the Brunettes in Springfield, Illinois, on 11 September.
 1876 – The Resolutes, modeled after the Vassar College team, developed their own version of uniforms which included long-sleeved shirts with frilled high necklines, embroidered belts, wide floor-length skirts, high button shoes and broad striped caps.
 1880 – A Smith College team was disbanded after disapproving mothers complained about the children playing the sport, saying it was not appropriate for women to play.
 1880s – The Dolly Vardens, an all-female, African-American team from Chester, Pennsylvania, was assembled by barber-turned-sports entrepreneur John Lang in the 1880s as a team that played for the entertainment of spectators.
 1920s – Philadelphia had factory teams for women, women's leagues, and the Philadelphia Bobbies for non-working women.
 1930s – The "Bold Years" for women's baseball; women baseball players toured internationally, played junior baseball, and signed minor league contracts.
 1943–54 – The All-American Girls Professional Baseball League (AAGPBL) was started by Philip Wrigley, owner of the Chicago Cubs and Wrigley's Chewing Gum.
 1944–54 – The National Girls Baseball League was founded by Charles Bidwell, owner of the Chicago Cardinals. The league consisted of teams in Chicago and operated for 11 seasons.
 1946 – Sophie Kurys set the stolen base record for the AAGPBL with 201 stolen bases in 203 attempts; this record continues to be unequalled in baseball history, as Rickey Henderson is second in stolen bases with 130 (1982).
 1947 – The Racine Belles of the AAGPBL started the Junior Belles baseball program; 100 girls tried out and 60 were selected to play on four teams; the Grays, Greens, Reds, and Golds.
 1948 – Dottie Wiltse pitched for the AAGPBL up until she was four months pregnant.
 1948 – The Junior Belles became more popular, as more girls tried out for the teams; other AAGPBL teams, such as the Lassies and the Comets, began to sponsor girls’ junior baseball teams.
 1948 – After five years of playing, the AAGBL (also known as the AAGPBL) starts throwing pitches overhand instead of underhand.
 1950 – The Racine Belles and Junior Belles folded due to lack of money.
 1955 – Bill Allington formed two women's teams called Allington's All-Stars which barnstormed the U.S. playing men's town and semi-pro teams, and lasted until 1957.
 1984 – Former Atlanta Braves executive Bob Hope founded the Sun Sox, an all-women's team, and tried to enter them into the Class A Florida State League; however, the league did not award Hope the franchise.
 1988 – American Women's Baseball Association (AWBA) founded in Chicago; first organized women's league since AAGPBL (1943–1954).
 1990s – American Women's Baseball League (AWBL; also known as American Women's Baseball, AWB) was founded by Jim Glennie in an effort to unite women's baseball teams and leagues around the country and to provide support to them.
 1992 – A League of Their Own movie about the AAGPBL was produced by Penny Marshall.
 1994 – Bob Hope formed and Coors Brewing Company sponsored the Colorado Silver Bullets women's baseball team which played men's college and minor league teams; the team existed for 4 years.
 1994 – Women's National Adult Baseball Association (WNABA) formed; 16 women's teams played in a women's world series in Phoenix in 1994.
 1995 – WNABA had 100 affiliated women's baseball teams in 16 states in the U.S.
 1997 – Ladies League Baseball was formed by San Diego businessperson Mike Ribant.
 1998 – After beginning its second season, the Ladies League Baseball expanded to 6 teams and went nationwide, but folds shortly after "due to lack of attendance".
 2000 – The American Women's Baseball League (AWBL) took women's baseball team to Japan to play Team Energen, the Japanese women's national team.
 2001 – The first Women's World Series (WWS) was played at the SkyDome in Toronto, Ontario, Canada; countries that participated included the United States of America, Australia, Canada, and Japan – the U.S. won the gold medal.
 2003 – Pawtucket Slaterettes all-girls' baseball league celebrated its 30th season of all-girls' baseball.
 2003 – Women's baseball became an official sport (39th) of the AAU; this marked the first time in United States history that a U.S. national organization began sanctioning and supporting women's baseball.
 2003 – The American Eagles of American Women's Baseball Federation (AWBF) became the first women's baseball team to be sanctioned by USA Baseball.
 2004 – The first-ever Women's Baseball World Cup was played in Edmonton, Alberta, Canada; the event was sanctioned by the International Baseball Association and Federation (IBAF) and was hosted by Baseball Canada. Seven Women's Baseball World Cup tournaments have been held biennially, most recently in September 2016.
 2004 – USA Baseball sanctioned the first official national women's baseball team; the team competed in the 2004 WWS (in Japan) and in the 2004 Women's World Cup of Baseball
 2004 – John Kovach, manager of the South Bend Blue Sox Women's Baseball Club, director of the Great Lakes Women's Baseball League, and AAU Women's Baseball Youth Baseball Chair, worked out a proposal with Little League Baseball to use the Michiana Girls’ Baseball League as a model league to develop girls’ Little League baseball programs around the country; Although Little League started a boy's softball program in 2000 because 500 boys were playing in Little League softball leagues around the U.S., the organization has not started a girls’ baseball program despite the thousands of girls playing baseball in Little League baseball leagues across the United States.
 2007 – Chicago Pioneers girls' baseball team became the first-ever U.S. Girls' Baseball National Champions after defeating the Pawtucket Slaterettes during the 2007 Women's Baseball National Championship/Girls' Baseball National Championship in Ft. Myers, Florida.
 2011 – The first ever members clubs are announced for Southern Ontario's Women's Baseball League. Those clubs are located in London, Guelph, St Catharines and Niagara Falls, Ontario, Canada. This would be the first ever professional league for women, aged 18 and over, in Ontario and would start playing in 2012.
 2015 – Women's baseball was added to the 2015 Pan American Games.
 2016 – Twelve teams competed in the 7th Women's Baseball World Cup, the most in history.

International competition
Organized international competition in women's baseball began with the 2001 Women's World Series played in Toronto's Skydome. Women's World Series events were held in 2002 (St. Petersburg, Florida), in 2003 (Gold Coast, Australia), and in 2004 (Uozu-city, Japan). These Women's World Series events were organized by the American Women's Baseball Federation and the Women's Baseball Association of Japan. They paved the way for official International Baseball Federation sanctioned Women's World Cup competitions.EDELMAN, R. O. B. E. R. T., & Elsey, B. (2020). Sport in Latin America. In Oxford Handbook of Sports History (pp. 362–363). essay, OXFORD UNIV Press US. 

In 2004 five countries competed in the first Women's Baseball World Cup in Edmonton, Canada: the United States, Canada, Australia, Japan and Taiwan. Subsequent tournaments have been held every two years, with the US winning the first two in 2004 and 2006, and Japan winning five consecutive gold medals from 2008 to 2016. In 2016, the field included twelve teams, more than had competed in any previous Women's Baseball World Cup: Australia, the Netherlands, Canada, Cuba, the United States, Venezuela, Taiwan, Hong Kong, India, Pakistan, Japan, and South Korea.

The first Pan American Women's Baseball Championship (I Campeonato Panamericano del Béisbol Femenino) was played in Valencia, Venezuela, from 13 to 20 November 2009. Teams that competed were Cuba, Venezuela, Puerto Rico, Colombia, Brazil, and the Dominican Republic. Women's baseball was added to the Pan American Games in 2015.

In the nineteen hundreds women in Latin America did in fact have involvement in sports, especially in baseball. Before society deemed sports as harmful to women's bodies and affected fertility, women were able to play as  it was used as a way to get people involved in public participation.  Major competition for women's sports started in 1900 when they were allowed to participate in the Olympic games but Latin America did not include a woman to represent their country until swimmer Maria Hulga Lenk in 1932. Later in the 1950s there was an international spread and they played tournaments which encouraged women in sports to play, especially Latin American women. The first tournament was held in Buenos Aires in 1951 where women populated about a third of the participants. Yet after a lot of breakthroughs, women's sports in Latin America were blocked from growing because of the Government not believing that women should be playing and should obey the gene rules and norms they had set for them.

See also

All-American Girls Professional Baseball League
Japan Women's Baseball League
North American Women's Baseball League
American Women's Baseball Federation
USA Baseball
Women in baseball

Notes